Yevgeni Valeryevich Grishkovetz (born  February 17, 1967 in Kemerovo) is a popular Russian writer, dramatist, stage director, actor and musician.

He is widely known as the author of witty solo performances. Grishkovets has staged authorial plays Odnovremenno, Planeta, Drednouty, Osada, Titanic, po Po and +1 and published a number of his books: collected plays Gorod (2001), Kak ya syel sobaku (2003), the novel Rubashka (2004), the story Reki (2005) and collected stories Planka (2006).

He has played supporting roles in remarkable Russian films including Progulka, Ne khlebom edinym and V kruge pervom.

Grishkovetz lives in Kaliningrad and tours with his theatre productions both in Russia and in Europe where he has become a welcome guest at many prestigious festivals.

Yevgeni is married and has three children: daughter Natalie (born in 1995), son Alexander (born in 2004) and daughter Maria (born in 2010).

References

External links
 A Fellow Who Has Eaten a Dog: Yevgeni Grishkovetz
 
 Interview with Grishkovetz 

1967 births
Living people
Russian writers
Russian male actors
People from Kemerovo
People from Kaliningrad
Russian theatre directors